2012 Auckland Open was a darts tournament that took place in Auckland, New Zealand on 22 September 2012.

Results

Men

Women

References

2012 in darts
2012 in New Zealand sport
Darts in New Zealand
September 2012 sports events in New Zealand